The voyage of the Beagle can refer to:

The second voyage of HMS Beagle
Charles Darwin's book about that voyage, The Voyage of the Beagle
Other voyages of HMS Beagle